Melissus may refer to:

 Melissus of Samos (fl. c. 500 BC), Greek philosopher
 Melissus of Thebes, Greek athlete contrasted to Orion by Pindar
 Gaius Maecenas Melissus (fl. early 1st century AD), Roman writer
 Melisseus (or Melissus), father of the nymphs Adrasteia and Ida, the nurses of Zeus on Crete
 Melissus (another mythological figure), father of Actaeon -- see Archias of Corinth